Louis R. Caplan (born December 31, 1936) is an American physician who is a senior member of the Division of Cerebrovascular Disease at Beth Israel Deaconess Medical Center, Boston. He is a Professor of Neurology at Harvard Medical School, Boston, and the founder of the Harvard Stroke Registry at Beth Israel Deaconess Medical Center. Caplan is the author or editor of 51 books and more than 700 articles in medical journals.

Background
Caplan was born in Baltimore, Maryland on December 31, 1936. His father worked in a drugstore and neither of his parents went to college. Caplan graduated from the A course at Baltimore City College High School and then attended Williams College in Williamstown, Massachusetts. There he was elected as a college junior to Phi Beta Kappa and graduated cum laude in 1958. Although a pre-med student, he majored in history and was the recipient of the Williams College history prize. Caplan then attended the University of Maryland School of Medicine and graduated summa cum laude in 1962 and was the valedictorian of his class. He lives in Brookline, Massachusetts with his wife Brenda, who he has been married to for more than 50 years. They have 6 children, 18 grandchildren, and 8 great-grandchildren.

Career
Caplan is a senior member of the Division of Cerebrovascular Disease at Beth Israel Deaconess Medical Center, Boston. He is a member of many professional societies, serving as an officer on committees for the American Heart Association, the American Academy of Neurology, and the American Neurological Association. He has served as the Chair of both the Boston Society of Neurology and the Chicago Neurological Society. He has mentored more than 75 fellows, including many international.

Books

Stroke (American Academy of Neurology), by Louis R. Caplan, October 1, 2005
Striking Back at Stroke: A Doctor-Patient Journal, by Cleo Hutton and M.D., Louis R. Caplan,  May 1, 2003
Stroke Syndromes, by Julien Bogousslavsky and Louis R. Caplan
Stroke: A Clinical Approach, by Louis R. Caplan, March 1993
Brain Embolism (Neurological Disease and Therapy), by Louis R. Caplan and Warren J. Manning, July 11, 2006
Cerebrovascular Disease, by H. Hunt Batjer, Louis R. Caplan, Lars Friberg,  and Ralph G., Jr. Greenlee January, 1997
American Heart Association: Family Guide to Stroke, Treatment, Recovery, and Prevention, by Louis R. Caplan, Mark L. Dyken,  and Donald Easton Paperback, 1994
Primer on Cerebrovascular Diseases, by M.A. Welch, Louis R. Caplan, Donald J. Reis,  and Bo K. Siesjo,  April 25, 1997
Brain-Stem Localization and Function, by Louis R. Caplan, H. Ch Hopf, R. Besser,  and Gunter Kramer, October 1993
Cerebral Small Artery Disease (Advances in Neurology), by Patrick M. Pullicino, Louis R. Caplan,  and Marc Hommel, July 1993
Cerebrovascular Diseases: Nineteenth Princeton Stroke Conference (Princeton Research Conference on Cerebrovascular Diseases//Cerebrovascular Diseases, by Princeton Stroke Conference, Michael A. Moskowitz, and Louis R. Caplan

Notes

1936 births
American neuroscientists
American neurologists
American science writers
University of Maryland, Baltimore alumni
Writers from Boston
Writers from Baltimore
Williams College alumni
Harvard Medical School faculty
Baltimore City College alumni
Living people